The Oak Park Arms is an independent living and assisted living retirement community located at 408 S. Oak Park Avenue, Oak Park, Illinois. The Oak Park Township Senior Services and The Lifelong Learning Center of Oak Park - River Forest are both located inside the Oak Park Arms. More than ten other providers of senior-centered care maintain offices at the Oak Park Arms. Kindness Creators, an intergenerational daycare located inside of Oak Park Arms, opened on August 29, 2019.

History
The Oak Park Arms was built in 1921 by George Cook and Arthur Lorenz at a cost of $750,000, and opened on April 20, 1922. The building was designed by Roy F. France. It was a luxury hotel and residence that hosted gala weddings and was host to notable guests, such as Eleanor Roosevelt. An addition was built on the south side of the building, which was completed in 1949. Joseph Glimco kept an apartment at the Oak Park Arms from 1955 to 1958.

In 1978, the Oak Park Arms was purchased and converted into a retirement community for seniors.

Radio stations
The Oak Park Arms has been home to several radio stations throughout its history. On February 15, 1924, WTAY, owned by the Oak Leaves newspaper, began broadcasting from the Oak Park Arms. In 1925, the station was sold to Coyne Electrical School and its call sign was changed to WGES. In 1926, the station was moved out of the Oak Park Arms. Ray Kroc played piano live on the air at WGES's studios in the Oak Park Arms.

On October 7, 1950, AM 1490 WOPA began broadcasting, with its studios and transmitter located at the Oak Park Arms. The station continues to broadcast from the Oak Park Arms and is owned by Daniela Wojcik's CSWWII, LLC, holding the call sign WEUR.

Ten days after WOPA signed on, its sister station WOPA-FM (current-day urban AC iHeartMedia-owned station WVAZ 102.7) began broadcasting, with its studios and transmitter also located at the Oak Park Arms. In 1971, 102.7's transmitter was moved to the John Hancock Center.

References

External links

Official Website
Retirement Villages

Hotels established in 1922
Hotel buildings completed in 1922
Buildings and structures in Cook County, Illinois
Retirement in the United States
Oak Park, Illinois
Retirement communities